Emil Tîmbur (born 21 July 1997) is a Moldovan football goalkeeper who plays for Milsami Orhei.

Club career
Tîmbur made his professional debut for Zimbru Chișinău in the Divizia Națională on 1 April 2017 against Milsami Orhei.

Notes

References

External links

1997 births
Living people
Footballers from Chișinău
Moldovan footballers
Association football goalkeepers
Moldovan Super Liga players
FC Zimbru Chișinău players
Belarusian Premier League players
FC Torpedo-BelAZ Zhodino players
Moldovan expatriate footballers
Moldovan expatriate sportspeople in Belarus
Expatriate footballers in Belarus
Moldova youth international footballers
Moldova under-21 international footballers
FC Milsami Orhei players
Moldova international footballers